{{DISPLAYTITLE:C26H35NO4}}
The molecular formula C26H35NO4 may refer to:

 Diprenorphine
 Diproteverine
 Lythranidine